John Slattery (born 1962) is an American actor and director.

John Slattery may also refer to:

 John Henry Slattery (died 1933), American politician from Colorado
 John P. Slattery (born 1958), American politician from Massachusetts
 John R. Slattery (1851–1926), co-founder of the Josephites, a Catholic religious community serving African Americans
 John Rodolph Slattery (1877–1932), general manager for the Interborough Rapid Transit Company in New York City
 John Slattery, host of the radio show Gascony Show
 Jack Slattery (John Terrence Slattery, 1878–1949), American baseball player
 Jack Slattery (footballer) (born as Edward John Slattery in 1937), Australian rules footballer